Holiest sites in Islam may refer to:
Holiest sites in Islam
Holiest sites in Sunni Islam
Holiest sites in Shia Islam